The Mound House is an archeological site located in Greene County, Illinois in the Illinois River floodplain.  The site is a multicomponent site; however, the mounds were constructed during the Middle Woodland and are associated with the Havana Hopewell culture. The mound center has two identified mounds.

The site received its name because the previous landowner, a farmer, built a house on Mound 1, the largest mound.  Since then the house has been removed and the land is owned by the Center for American Archeology.

The site was added to the National Register of Historic Places on September 1, 1978.

See also
List of archaeological sites on the National Register of Historic Places in Illinois

References

Havana Hopewell culture
Buildings and structures in Greene County, Illinois
Archaeological sites on the National Register of Historic Places in Illinois
Mounds in Illinois
National Register of Historic Places in Greene County, Illinois